Senator Bolton may refer to:

Chester C. Bolton (1882–1939), Ohio State Senate
William P. Bolton (1885–1964), Maryland State Senate